Ika Meporiya (born 26 January 1989) is a professional Ukrainian of Georgian descent football midfielder who plays for FC Arsenal Kyiv.

In 2003, he moved to Ukraine and got Ukrainian citizenship.

Career 
Ika Meporiya made his professional debut for FC Arsenal Kyiv Youth in the Ukrainian Premier League Reserves. On 23 August 2010, he made his professional debut for Arsenal Kyiv.

References

External links
Official Website Profile

 

FC Arsenal Kyiv players
FC Naftovyk-Ukrnafta Okhtyrka players
FC Prykarpattia Ivano-Frankivsk (2004) players
Ukrainian footballers
Association football midfielders
Living people
1989 births